Anastasia Shcherbachenia (born 9 January 1990) is a Belarusian football manager and former player who played as a midfielder and has appeared for the Belarus women's national team.

Career
Shcherbachenia has been capped for the Belarus national team, appearing for the team during the 2019 FIFA Women's World Cup qualifying cycle.

International goals

References

External links
 
 
 
 

1990 births
Living people
Belarusian women's footballers
Belarus women's international footballers
Women's association football midfielders
FC Minsk (women) players
Bobruichanka Bobruisk players
Expatriate women's footballers in Estonia
Belarusian football managers
Expatriate football managers in Estonia
Belarusian expatriate football managers
Belarusian expatriate footballers
Belarusian expatriate sportspeople in Estonia